"Guardian Angels" is a song written Naomi Judd, John Barlow Jarvis and Don Schlitz, and recorded by American country music duo The Judds.  It was released in March 1990 as the fourth single from the album River of Time.  The song reached #16 on the Billboard Hot Country Singles & Tracks chart.

Chart performance

References

1990 singles
The Judds songs
Songs written by John Barlow Jarvis
Songs written by Naomi Judd
Songs written by Don Schlitz
RCA Records singles
Curb Records singles
Song recordings produced by Brent Maher
1989 songs